Electric Coconut (aka Elektrik Cokernut) were an English Moog band who formed in Surrey in the 1970s. The group consisted of Len Hunter and Bill Wellings of BWD Productions.

Bill Wellings, an Australian former catalogue model, had pioneered the anonymous pop cover versions concept with the Top Six EPs in the mid-60s, a series that gave a big break to a young arranger named Johnny Harris.

Wellings formed BWD in the late 1960s and did an exclusive deal with Music for Pleasure (MFP) – the first 'Hits' LP, Hits 67, came out some time later. It was widely rumoured that this LP featured David Bowie singing on the track "Penny Lane", but it was actually session singer Tony Steven. Hits 70 did feature Elton John.

The first Hot Hits LP came in 1970 and features versions of 'Vehicle' and "Groovin' With Mr Bloe"; the latter played by Larry Adler. Hot Hits Vol. 2 features Blue Mink's Barry Morgan on drums, as does Vol 4.

Among the music directors regularly used by BWD Productions were Alan Moorhouse, Johnny Harris, Johnny Howard and Len Hunter.

BWD was based in Guildford. Bill Wellings is deceased and the BWD catalogue is now in the hands of his wife. BWD also recorded for the Contour label using the name 'Cherry Orchard Productions'; Swing Gently with Strauss was one of their releases.

Discography
 Popcorn (and other switched-on smash hits) (1972/73) Axis Records (EMI) AXIS 6060
Side One
01 - Popcorn
02 - Samson and Delilah
03 - Mouldy Old Dough
04 - Chirpy Chirpy Cheep Cheep
05 - Wig-Wam Bam
06 - Morning Has Broken
Side Two
07 - Jungle Juice
08 - Seaside Shuffle
09 - Softly Whispering I Love You
10 - Jeepster
11 - Song Sung Blue
12 - Back Off Boogaloo
 Go Moog release (1973) MFP with same track list EMI/MFP 50071
 Ticker Tape (1974)

References

External links

Audio of Popcorn album: https://archive.org/details/ElectricCoconutPopcorn

British instrumental musical groups
Musical groups established in the 1970s
1970s establishments in England